Desmond Mythen is an Irish hurler who played as a right corner-forward with the Wexford senior team.

Mythen made his debut on the inter-county scene at the age of sixteen when he was selected for the Wexford minor team. He enjoyed two unsuccessful championship seasons with the minor team. He subsequently joined the Wexford under-21 team, winning a Leinster medal in 2004. Muthen made his senior debut during the 2005 championship.

Career statistics

Club

References

Year of birth missing (living people)
Living people
Oulart-the-Ballagh hurlers
Wexford inter-county hurlers